Bianca of Burgundy (1288 – July 1348), was a Countess consort of Savoy by marriage to Edward, Count of Savoy. She was the mother of Joan of Savoy.

Life
She was born to Robert II, Duke of Burgundy, and Agnes of France. She married in 1307 Edward, Count of Savoy.  

The marriage was arranged by her mother, and the negotiations was signed at the French court of her uncle, the king of France, in Paris. In the marriage contract, her future spouse was officially secured the position of heir to Savoy. The wedding took place on 17 October 1307 at the Château de Montbard in Burgundy. 
In 1323, her spouse succeeded to become Count of Savoy. She commissioned a Book of Hours, titled Hours of Savoy, later kept at the Beinecke Library, Yale University. Her daughter Joan married the duke of Brittany in 1329. 

Blanche was widowed when her spouse Edward died in Gentilly in 1329. Her was succeeded by his brother Aymon. Blanche negotiated with her brother-in-law about her dowry until 8 February 1330, when she was secured Bourg, Treffort, Coligny, Jasseron, Trivier, Pont-de-Vesle and Pontdevaux in Bresse; she was also granted a house in Faubourg Saint-Marcel in Paris by the king of France in 1333. 

Her daughter Joan questioned the succession and claimed the rights fo Savoy from her uncle between 1329 and 1339. In 1346 and 1347, she used her influence at the court of her nephew, Amadeus VI, to pursue closer alliances with Burgundy to offset the pending sale of the Dauphiné to France. This led to his brief engagement with Joan of Burgundy, daughter of Philip of Burgundy and Joan I, Countess of Auvergne.

She died July 1348, perhaps from the Black Death.

Notes

References
 

|-

1288 births
1348 deaths
Countesses of Savoy
13th-century French women 
13th-century French people 
14th-century French women 
14th-century French people